Nassarius pyrrhus, common name the red-banded nassa, is a species of sea snail, a marine gastropod mollusc in the family Nassariidae, the nassa mud snails or dog whelks.

Description
The length of the shell varies between 14 mm and 22 mm.

The shell is ovate and conical. The spire is short, pointed, composed of seven or eight convex whorls. These are noduled at their upper part, ornamented upon their whole external surface with slightly undulated longitudinal folds. Often the folds upon the body whorl disappear partially upon the edge of the outer lip, and this whorl presents at its base a few striae which intersect the folds crosswise, and thus form granulations. The whitish aperture is subrotund and a little narrowed above. The thick outer lip is accompanied by a slightly prominent external varix.  The internal part of the lip is marked with numerous fine striae.

Distribution
This species is endemic to Australia and occurs off New South Wales, South Australia, Tasmania, Victoria, Western Australia.

References

 Menke, C.T. 1843. Molluscorum Novae Hollandiae Specimen in Libraria Aulica Hahniana. Hannoverae : Libraria Aulica Hahniana pp. 1–46
 Lamarck, J.B.P.A. de M. 1822. Histoire naturelle des Animaux sans Vertèbres. Paris : J.B. Lamarck Vol. 7 711 pp.
 Adams, A. 1852. Catalogue of the species of Nassa, a genus of Gasteropodous Mollusca, belonging to the family Buccinidae, in the Collection of Hugh Cuming, Esq., with the description of some new species. Proceedings of the Zoological Society of London 1851(19): 94–112 
 Iredale, T. 1915. A comparison of the land Molluscan faunas of the Kermadec Group and Norfolk Island. Transactions of the New Zealand Institute 47: 498–508 
 Cernohorsky W.O. (1981). Revision of the Australian and New Zealand Tertiary and Recent species of the family Nassariidae (Mollusca: Gastropoda). Records of the Auckland Institute and Museum 18:137–192
 Wilson, B. 1994. Australian Marine Shells. Prosobranch Gastropods. Kallaroo, WA : Odyssey Publishing Vol. 2 370 pp.

External links
 
 

Nassariidae
Gastropods described in 1843
Gastropods of Australia